Woman on a Black Divan (French: La femme au divan noir), also known simply as Recumbent Woman (Femme couchée) is a 1869 painting by the French artist Jean-Jacques Henner. It is one of the 44 Henner paintings of the Musée des Beaux-Arts of Mulhouse, France, the second largest collection of Henner works in the world after the Musée national Jean-Jacques Henner (MNJJH). Its inventory number is D.58.1.22.

The painting was shown at the Paris Salon of 1869, and bought for the collection of the Société industrielle de Mulhouse (from which the Musée des Beaux-Arts originated) by the widow of Daniel Dollfus the same year. A much smaller version of the painting is kept in the MNJJH since 1923.

References

External links 
tableau : la femme au divan noir on Base Palissy

1869 paintings
Paintings in Alsace
Oil on canvas paintings
Nude art